Tito Satya (Nepali:तितो सत्य) was a Nepali sitcom weekly television series that premiered in 2003. Deepak Raj Giri was the script writer, director, and one of the main characters. The show aired every Thursday on Nepal Television. Integrating political and social topics into a comedy drama, Tito Satya was one of the most viewed programs in Nepal. The show ended in November 2015 after 12 years of continuous broadcast.

Cast

 Deepak Raj Giri as Deepak
 Deepa Shree Niraula as Deepa
 Gopal Adhikari as Twakendra
 Nirmal Sharma as Nirmal Boss, often called by teasing as Gaida ("Rhinoceros")
 Raj Acharya as Raj (son of Deepak and Deepa)
 Prem Pandey
 Gopal Nepal
 Gopal Dhakal as Chhande  
 Shishir Amgai
 Ram Mani Bhattarai 
 Uddav Bhattarai
 Sine Adhikari
 Mukunda Mainali

References

Nepalese television series
2000s Nepalese television series
2010s Nepalese television series